The 2019 Roller Hockey African Championship was the first edition of this tournament, played in Angola between 8 and 10 March 2019.

This tournament was played independently served as qualifier for the 2019 Roller Hockey World Cup, by giving only one place to the World Cup and two more for the Intercontinental Cup, second tier.

Angola conquered the first edition, contested by only three teams due to the refusal of South Africa.

Standings

References

External links
World Skate

Roller hockey
Roller hockey competitions
African Roller Hockey Championship, 2019
2019 in African sport
International roller hockey competitions hosted by Angola